The 2002 China Open was a professional ranking snooker tournament that took place from 24 February to 3 March 2002 at the International Gymnastic Centre in Shanghai, China. It was the sixth ranking event of the 2001–02 season.

The reigning champion was Ronnie O'Sullivan, who was defeated 5–3 in the quarter-finals by Mark Selby. Mark Williams won in the final 9–8 against Anthony Hamilton.


Main draw

Final

References

2002
China Open
Open (snooker)
Sports competitions in Shanghai